The 1958 Minnesota Golden Gophers football team represented the University of Minnesota in the 1958 Big Ten Conference football season. In their fifth year under head coach Murray Warmath, the Golden Gophers compiled a 1–8 record and were outscored by their opponents by a combined total of 157 to 115.
 
Guard Everette Gerths received the team's Most Valuable Player award. Center Mike Svendsen was named All-Big Ten first team. Svendsen and offensive lineman Perry Gehring were named Academic All-Big Ten.

Total attendance at five home games was 288,817, an average of 57,763 per game. The largest crowd was against Iowa.

Schedule

References

Minnesota
Minnesota Golden Gophers football seasons
Minnesota Golden Gophers football